Adriana (Jeanne) Fortanier-de Wit (19 April 1907 - 23 December 1993) was a Dutch politician who was member of the House of Representatives for the Freedom Party (PvdV) from 1946 until 1948, and then for the People's Party for Freedom and Democracy (VVD) until 1958.

References

1907 births
1993 deaths
Dutch politicians
Dutch feminists
1950s in the Netherlands